A Lost Life is a 1976 West German drama film directed by Ottokar Runze. It was entered into the 26th Berlin International Film Festival, where Gerhard Olschewski won the Silver Bear for Best Actor.

Cast
 Gerhard Olschewski as Cioska
 Marius Müller-Westernhagen as Sigorski
 Gert Haucke as Kommissar Weber

References

External links

1976 films
1976 crime drama films
German crime drama films
West German films
1970s German-language films
Films directed by Ottokar Runze
Films set in the 1920s
German black-and-white films
1970s German films